William Noble may refer to:
William Bonneau Noble (1780–1831), English landscape painter
William H. Noble (1788–1850), United States Representative from New York
William Noble (jockey) (1814–1897), English jockey
William Henry Noble (British Army officer) (1834–1892), Anglo-Irish army officer
William Clark Noble (1858–1938), American sculptor
William Henry Noble (American Army officer) (1813-1894), American Civil War officer
William Noble, 1st Baron Kirkley (1863–1935), English shipowner
William Noble (missionary) (1866–1945), American missionary in Korea

See also
Bill Noble (1884–1937), rugby league player
William Nobles (disambiguation)